Side Street Story (meaning "Millionaire Naples") is a 1950 Italian comedy film directed by Eduardo De Filippo, who wrote the play upon which the film is based.  It was entered into the 1951 Cannes Film Festival.

Plot
In Naples in 1942, people are in crisis due to the Second World War. Gennaro has a café and hopes that the family will help him with the work so that it can settle down. His wife is engaged in the Black Market to help keep them going, and one thing leads to another. His son Amedeo, however, envisions revolutions and the redemption of the poor. Peppe is killed in a tragic accident while being arrested during street violence, an event which is not seen in the play. Gennaro's family mysteriously enters into a crisis and, among various other adventures and sad situations, Pasquale, a family member believed to be dead, comes onto the scene. Though not in the original stage piece, the part of Pasquale was written specifically for the actor Toto.

Cast
 Eduardo De Filippo – Gennaro Iovine
 Leda Gloria – Amalia, la moglie di Gennaro
 Delia Scala – Maria Rosaria Iovine, la figlia di Gennaro
 Gianni Musy – Amedeo Iovine figlio di Gennaro (as Gianni Glori)
 Totò – Pasquale Miele
 Titina De Filippo – Adelaide
 Carlo Ninchi – Il brigadiere di Ps
 Dante Maggio – Il rosticciere
 Laura Gore – La moglie del ragionier Spasiani
 Mario Soldati – Il ragioner Spasiani
 Aldo Giuffrè – Federico
 Carlo Mazzoni – Il sergente americano
 Michael Tor – L'ufficiale americano
 Aldo Tonti
 Pietro Carloni – Un soldato americano
 Mario Frera – Peppe "'o Cricco"
 Pietro Pennetti – Un soldato
 Giacomo Rondinella – Il cantante di concertino
 Rosita Pisano – Assunta
 Concetta Palumbo – Riruccia
 Mariano Englen
 Carlo Giuffrè – Ernesto
 Nino Vingelli – Giovanni

References

External links

1950 films
1950 comedy films
Films scored by Nino Rota
1950s Italian-language films
Italian black-and-white films
Films based on works by Eduardo De Filippo
Films directed by Eduardo De Filippo
Films set in Naples
Italian comedy films
1950s Italian films